In Utah folklore, the North Shore Monster is a monster purported to live in Utah's Great Salt Lake.

History
At dusk or evening of the early summer of 1877, J.H. McNeil of Kelton, Box Elder County, and several other employees of the Barnes and Co. Salt Works company on the lake's north shore reported seeing a huge creature with a crocodile-like body and the head of a horse in the waters of the Great Salt Lake. The creature made a "fearsome bellowing noise" and charged the workers, who promptly ran up a nearby hillside and hid in the brush until morning. Some believe the "monster" was a buffalo. Around 30 years earlier, "a man identified only as Brother Bainbridge reported seeing a monster with a dolphin-like body in the lake near Antelope Island."

References

American legendary creatures
Great Salt Lake
Utah folklore
Water monsters